The Other Brother is a 2002 American comedy-drama film written and directed by Mandel Holland and starring Mekhi Phifer, Andre Blake, Michele Morgan and Tangi Miller.

Cast
Mekhi Phifer as Martin
Tangi Miller as Paula
Andre Blake as Junnie
Michele Morgan as Bobbi
Ebony Jo-Ann as Mother Pearl

Release
The film was released on April 24, 2002 in Los Angeles and on April 26, 2002 in Manhattan.

Reception
The film has a 33% rating on Rotten Tomatoes based on six reviews.

Kevin Thomas of the Los Angeles Times gave the film a positive review, calling it "a perfectly pleasant if slightly pokey comedy..."

Dave Kehr of The New York Times also gave the film a positive review, calling it "a sweet-tempered comedy that forgoes the knee-jerk misogyny that passes for humor in so many teenage comedies..."

References

External links
 
 

American comedy-drama films
2000s English-language films
2002 comedy-drama films